Regarding the Fountain is a 1998 epistolary children's novel by Kate Klise. It is the first book in a series set in Missouri.

Regarding the Fountain is a children's book told entirely in letters, memos, postcards, and even telegraphs. The story itself takes place in Dry Creek, Missouri. The back-story unfolds as the reader progresses; but thirty years before the spring that the town relied on mysteriously dried up. At the same time, a new middle school opened. The story follows Sam N.'s class of fifth graders as they communicate with Florence Waters, a fountain designer, who has agreed to fix a leaky water fountain in the school. 

The sequels are Regarding the Sink (2004), Regarding the Trees (2005), and Regarding the Bathrooms (2006), and, most recently, Regarding the Bees (2007).

Plot summary
The novel tells the story of Florence Waters, a free-spirited, quirky fountain designer on her quest to create a unique and beautiful fountain for the children of Dry Creek. Through a series of misunderstandings and funny situations, the kids uncover a scandal that shocks the entire town. They end up with a fantastic fountain and a new friend. But suddenly Sam N's class finds out the truth on what really happened that day when the creek dries up.

Two people named Sally Mander and Delbert "Dee" Eel capped off the pipes that lead to the spring and redirected them back to Dee's waters company and Sally's swimming pool in their scandal to make thousands of dollars until one day a few fifth-graders caught them, and threw them behind bars. The city that was once known as Spring Creek, then Dry Creek was renamed Geyser Creek.

Characters
In Regarding the Fountain (and the rest of the series) many of the characters names have to do with water. Some examples: Sam N. (salmon); Florence Waters (the flow of water); Sally Mander (salamander); Delbert "Dee" Eel (Delbert the Eel); Lily and Paddy (Lily Pad); Gil (a fish's gills); Shelly (a turtle shell); Minnie O. (minnow); Tad Poll (tadpole); Goldie Fisch (goldfish); Walter Russ (walrus); Pearl O. Ster (pearl oyster); Cora Reef (coral reef); Ima Crabbie (I'm crabby or I'm a crab); & Barry Cuda (Barracuda).

Florence Waters - A fountain designer that has designed many fountains. She is very cultural and likes the children and sends them many presents. She's annoyingly happy-go-lucky.

Sam N. - He is a teacher at Dry Creek Middle School.

Walter Russ - The principal of Dry Creek middle school. He hates being called Wally.

Goldie Fisch - She is the sweet secretary of Dry Creek middle school. Walter makes her write letters for him.

Lily and Paddy - They're best friends. They suggested that the fountain was big enough to splash around in.

Shelly and Tad - Shelly and Tad are good friends. They suggest the different drinks in the fountain.

Minnie O - She's the smartest in Sam N's class. She suggests the fish in the fountain.

Gil - There isn't much you find out about Gil. He suggests the loop the loop fountain which is seen on the cover of the book.

1998 American novels
1998 children's books
American children's novels
Epistolary novels
Novels set in Missouri
Novels set in high schools and secondary schools